Following the incredible success of the Twig Science program in the US, Twig Education was acquired by Imagine Learning, the largest provider of digital curriculum solutions in the US, and rebranded as Imagine Learning Studios. The change allows us to invest more in our product and push ahead with ambitious plans to further expand across the US.

There is no change to the name Twig Science, which is a key part of Imagine Learning's offering.

As Imagine Learning Studios, we will continue to produce comprehensive, engaging multimedia learning experiences for students for an expanded range of subjects, now including mathematics (Imagine Learning Illustrative Mathematics) and ELA (Imagine Learning EL Education).

Imagine Learning is a digital media company that offers educational content to schools via subscription websites.

Imagine Learning's products are based on real-world video content, with three-minute videos on science, engineering, and mathematics. These are accompanied by learning materials for students and teachers. The films are created using documentary footage from major archives (including the BBC Motion Gallery, NASA, Science Photo Library, and Getty Images among others) as well as self-produced graphics and animations.

The company name was originally Twig World Ltd. but changed to Twig Education in 2018.

History
Twig first launched its digital content at the BETT show in January 2011. Initially, 250 videos were available, covering aspects of chemistry, biology, physics, and earth science. The videos were around 3 minutes long and aimed at students between the ages of 10 and 16.

Twig now has over 2,500 three-minute videos available in English in science, geography, and mathematics. Each film comes with support learning materials including transcripts, quizzes, and downloadable images.

Before Twig’s public launch in January 2011, the company was known as LL Online. LL Online worked in conjunction with Learning Teaching Scotland. To date, Twig Education has continued to work with Learning Teaching Scotland (now renamed Education Scotland) and renewed its contract to supply the resource as part of Glow (Scottish Schools National Intranet) for a further three years in December 2011. In 2015 this contract was renewed by Education Scotland for one year with the option for a further one-year extension. This contract with Education Scotland was set to end in July 2017.

In January 2016, Imperial College London announced a £3.5 million Series B investment into Twig Education.

In 2018, Twig Education started developing a new product, Twig Science, specifically aimed at the new NGSS Framework that had been adopted in many states in the US. Twig Science is an integrated science program for kindergarten to grade 8 and is now being sold to various districts in California, as well as in some other American states like Louisiana and Nevada.

Twig World has two UK offices – one in Glasgow and other one in London.

In 2021 Twig Education was acquired by US-based Weld North Education (WNE).

Products

Twig Science 
Twig Science is a phenomena-based science program for TK/Pre-K to grade 6, built for the Next Generation Science Standards (NGSS) and aimed at California. When developing this product, Twig partnered with SCALE (The Stanford Center for Assessment, Learning, and Equity) to develop the assessments that are embedded throughout the program. The program was launched in 2018 and submitted for review to the California Board of Education. Following the review, Twig Science was one of the programs officially adopted by the Board.

In addition to the NGSS, Twig Science also covers California’s Common Core Standards in English Language, Arts, Literacy, and Math. In the Twig Science program, science subjects and engineering are taught interdisciplinarily, with a focus on real-world phenomena and storylines. Each grade is divided into modules, which are centered around an Anchor Phenomena. The modules are then divided into Driving Questions, which are in turn split into lessons.

Teaching material in Twig Science is available both online on a digital platform, and through physical books: one for teachers (the Teacher Edition) and one for students (the Twig Book). On the digital platform, teachers and students can access science videos, interactive games and quizzes, and other teaching material. Teachers can also access assessment tools through the digital platform. The program also includes integrated ELA lessons. All content is reviewed by Imperial College London.

In addition to Twig Science for California, there is also Twig Science Next Gen, which follows the same structure as Twig Science but is aimed at the whole of the US. This program is currently being sold to states such as Nevada and Louisiana. The program follows the NGSS three-dimensional standards while also meeting English Language Arts, WIDA, and math standards.

Twig World 
Twig’s original product was a package entitled Twig for Science. It is a resource for secondary schools offered as a subscription package that includes science videos and learning materials. In September 2012 Twig World launched an upgraded product, Twig. New content was added to support teaching and learning in math and geography.

Currently, Twig resources cover math, science, and geography, and all videos range from one to seven months in length. They are made for teachers and pupils at Key Stage 1 Key Stage 2, Key Stage 3, and GCSE levels, and their curriculum equivalents around the world. The majority of Twig World's films can be divided into “core” and “context” films. “Core” films are focused on key curriculum learning points, whilst “context” films cover real-life applications and extensions of the core learning points, as well as aspects of science history. Twig's "glossary" films cover key scientific terms and are one minute long.

The films are produced in Twig Education's production facility in Glasgow, using archive footage from a range of sources, including the BBC Motion Gallery, Getty Images, NASA, CBS, Science Photo Library, and the US National Archives. Animations, graphics, and text are produced and incorporated into the films during post-production after which, voice-overs are added. Many videos are also available in other languages.

All films are accompanied by a set of learning materials. These include transcripts of the films, key learning points, photographic and diagrammatic resources, and handouts for pupils that include detailed notes on the topics, as well as quizzes and extension questions.

Tigtag
Primary school resources from Twig are produced under the brand Tigtag. These resources are also aimed at school use, with film streaming, lesson plans, activity suggestions, and interactive features available online.

Tigtag for Science
Tigtag is Twig Education's product for primary and elementary schools, designed to support the teaching of KS2 science and its global equivalents. Tigtag offers background knowledge for teachers, lesson planning ideas, and multimedia content for the classroom.

People and Places
Launched in 2014, People and Places added a new geography module for Tigtag and includes the same range of films and learning materials to help support the teaching of geography in the classroom.

Tigtag Junior
Tigtag Junior offers materials for students aged 4–7. Tigtag Junior includes films and lesson materials as well as interactive games and puzzles.

Reach Out CPD
In 2014, Twig Education partnered with Imperial College London through the primary resource Tigtag to create Reach Out CPD, an online professional development resource to support primary school teachers in teaching science. The program is championed by Imperial's Professor of Science and Society, Lord Robert Winston, and all resources are free to primary school teachers in the UK.

With Reach Out CPD, teachers learn about scientific concepts and get ideas for classroom projects and lessons, through films produced by Twig Education/Tigtag. The videos are available in 20-minute units that also include interactive elements and tips on how to encourage learning.

Studies and reviews

University of Glasgow
An evaluation of GlowScience was carried out by the SCRE Centre and the School of Education at the University of Glasgow, with their final report being released in April 2011. The evaluation was commissioned by Learning Teaching Scotland and was conducted between October 2010 and February 2011, with part of its remit being to ascertain the extent to which GlowScience resources were supporting teachers and helping to engage pupils.

In the report, GlowScience resources “were deemed to be of excellent quality and of a high standard, trustworthy, suitably tailored for children and young people, and highly effective teaching and learning resources”.

University of Lancaster
Research carried out by Dr. Don Passey, from Lancaster University’s Department of Educational Research in 2013, showed that Twig videos make math and science lessons more memorable in the longer term. Dr. Passey’s research set out to explore some of the issues around learning science about shorter- and longer-term learning. He concluded that there were strong indications that:
 video is:
 particularly good for supporting understanding of concept-based topics (such as math and science)
 useful for supporting science concepts with those who:
 have lower levels of interest in the subject
 start within a mid-range of test scores

Press and media
Various reviews of Twig Education resources have been published by the educational press and online media. This includes reviews by practicing teachers as well as educational experts, from publications such as the TES and Teach Primary.

Awards

2011
 MEDEA Awards: Finalist, 2011.
 Interactive Media Awards: Winner, Best in Class (Science and Technology), 2011.

2012
 BETT Awards: Winner, Secondary Digital Content, 2012.
 ERA (Education Resources Awards): Winner, Best Secondary Resource or Equipment involving ICT, 2012. Finalist, Innovation Award category.
 Learning on Screen Awards: Winner, Courseware and Curriculum Award, 2012.

2013
Teachers' Choice Awards: Winner, 2013.
BETT Awards: Winner, Digital Collections and Resource Banks, 2013.
EdTech Top 20: One of Europe's Top 20 Educational Technology Businesses, 2013.
Education Investor Awards: Finalist, Exporting Excellence, 2013.
Academics' Choice Award: Winner, Smart Media, 2013.

2014
BETT Awards: Winner, Primary Digital Content, 2014.

2015
BETT Awards: Finalist, International Digital Resources, 2015

2016
BETT Awards: Winner, Best Open Educational Resource, 2016

Leadership Team 
Catherine Cahn - Chief Executive Officer
David Sadler - Chief Finance Officer
Natasha Stillwell - Chief Creative Officer
Cheryl De La Vega - VP of US Sales
Clifton Stubblefield - Chief Operations Officer
Alan Barrow - Chief Digital Officer
Tracey Lv - VP Asia

Distribution

United Kingdom
Twig provides its digital content to schools in the UK through an online subscription service, offered directly to schools and local authorities.

United States 
In late 2011, Twig Education announced a partnership deal with Carolina Biological, making Twig World's products available to more than 180,000 teachers and 15,000 schools in the USA.

In 2018, Twig Education's complete science program for TK–8, Twig Science, was launched in the US, with a particular focus on California. Twig Education's original products are still available for purchase in the US.

International 
In early 2012, Twig Education partnered with Benesse Corporation of Japan, with films in Japanese being made available to students from April 2012.

Later in 2012, Twig partnered with Santillana to distribute its products in institutions across Spain and Latin America. Santillana is the largest educational distributor in these areas with over 40,000 educational establishments and a 30% market share in Spain, Peru, Argentina, Chile, and Colombia.

Twig also distributes its content directly to schools in Australia and South Africa through its online subscription service. In mid-2012, Twig partnered with Doosan education publishers to distribute Twig in Korea through their home learning.

Since early 2013, Twig Education has worked with Abril Educação to distribute materials to schools and sistemas in Brazil.

References

Educational technology companies of the United Kingdom
British educational websites
Companies based in Glasgow
Information technology organisations based in the United Kingdom